Caripeta divisata, known generally as the gray spruce looper or twin-spot girdle, is a species of geometrid moth in the family Geometridae. It is found in North America.

The MONA or Hodges number for Caripeta divisata is 6863.

References

Further reading

External links

 

Ourapterygini
Articles created by Qbugbot
Moths described in 1863